Porius is a genus of Papuan jumping spiders that was first described by Tamerlan Thorell in 1892.  it contains only two species, found only in Papua New Guinea: P. decempunctatus and P. papuanus.

References

Arthropods of New Guinea
Salticidae
Salticidae genera
Spiders of Asia
Taxa named by Tamerlan Thorell